The Frustrators are an American punk rock band with Jason Chandler (lead vocals), Terry Linehan (guitar, vocals), Art Tedeschi (drums), and Mike Dirnt (bass, vocals). All are members of other bands, Terry Linehan from Waterdog, Jason Chandler and Art Tedeschi from Violent Anal Death, and Mike Dirnt from Green Day.

They have had two releases with Adeline Records, the EP Bored in the USA and their debut LP Achtung Jackass. The Frustrators released a new EP, entitled Griller, on February 15, 2011.

Achtung Jackass era
On 11 March 2002, The Frustrators released Achtung Jackass, on the Adeline Records label. "Bonus Track" is recorded backwards.

A reviewer at AllMusic described the album as "an enjoyable combination of new wave and bratty, goofball punk", with the song "My Best Friend's Girl" pegged as "setting the tone for the record" and showing "the band's ability to earnestly incorporate the diverse catchiness of new wave that makes it so true blue".

Band members
 Jason Chandler - lead vocals (1999–present)
 Terry Linehan - guitar, vocals (1999–present)
 Mike Dirnt - bass, vocals (1999–present)
 Art Tedeschi - drums (1999–present)

Discography
Bored in the USA EP (2000) – Adeline Records
Achtung Jackass  (2002) – Adeline Records
Griller EP (2011) Adeline Records/Dr. Strange Records

References

External links

American punk rock groups
Adeline Records artists